Camino is a 2015 American action-thriller film directed by Josh C. Waller. It was based on a story created by Daniel Noah and Josh C. Waller. The film stars Zoë Bell as the lead character, along with Nacho Vigalondo, Francisco Barreiro, Sheila Vand and Kevin Pollak in supporting roles. The film was released on 4 March 2016 in the United States.

Cast
 Zoë Bell as Avery Taggert, a photographer
 Nacho Vigalondo as Guillermo, leader of El Guero
 Francisco Barreiro as Tomas
 Sheila Vand as Marianna
 Tenoch Huerta Mejía as Alejo
 Dominic Rains as Daniel
 Kevin Pollak as Daniel
 Jason Canela as Sebastian
 Nancy Gomez as Luna
 Cindy Vela as TV Reporter

Release
The film was released on 4 March 2016 in limited in the United States, and release in DVD in select countries.

Reception
The film critics aggregator Rotten Tomatoes gave the film an approval rating of 27% based on 17 reviews and an average rating of 5.3/10, calling it:"A competent but unmemorable B-movie that eschews any real political content in favor of simple, brutal survival melodrama with scant room for surprises in plot, character or directorial style".

References

External links
 
 

2015 films
American action thriller films
2010s English-language films
2010s American films